Lac des Hermines is a lake near Super-Besse, in Puy-de-Dôme, France. At an elevation of 1350 m, its surface area is 0.14 km².

Hermines